Grant Jacobs Delpit (born September 20, 1998) is an American football strong safety for the Cleveland Browns of the National Football League (NFL). He played college football at LSU, where he was a two-time consensus All-America selection and winner of the Jim Thorpe Award as a junior in 2019. He was drafted by the Browns in the second round of the 2020 NFL Draft.

Early years
Born in New Orleans, Delpit and his family were displaced after Hurricane Katrina and eventually settled in Houston, Texas. Delpit attended St. Thomas High School for two years before transferring to Lamar High School as a junior. For his senior season, he transferred to IMG Academy in Bradenton, Florida, where he was teammates with Dylan Moses. As a senior he had 47 tackles and five interceptions. He committed to Louisiana State University (LSU) to play college football.

College career

As a true freshman at LSU in 2017, Delpit played in all 13 games with 10 starts, recording 60 tackles and one interception. He returned to LSU as a starter in 2018.  Following a junior season where he won the Jim Thorpe Award, Delpit announced that he would forgo his senior season and declared for the 2020 NFL Draft.

Professional career

Delpit was drafted by the Cleveland Browns in the second round with the 44th overall pick of the 2020 NFL Draft. He suffered an Achilles tendon tear during training camp that required surgery, which ended his rookie season. He was placed on the injured reserve list on August 25, 2020.

NFL career statistics

References

External links

Cleveland Browns bio
LSU Tigers bio

1998 births
Living people
Players of American football from Houston
American football safeties
LSU Tigers football players
All-American college football players
Cleveland Browns players
Ed Block Courage Award recipients